Tangab (also Romanized as Tangāb; also known as Tangāb-e Avval) is a village in Kuhestani-ye Talesh Rural District, in the Central District of Talesh County, Gilan Province, Iran. At the 2006 census, its population was 163, in 42 families.

References 

Populated places in Talesh County